The third season of the FX legal drama series Damages premiered on January 25, 2010 and concluded on April 19, 2010. It consisted of 13 episodes, bringing the series total to 39. Damages was created by brothers Todd and Glenn Kessler, along with Daniel Zelman, each of whom served as executive producer and contributed four scripts for the season, including the premiere and the finale.

The season picks up one year after the events of season two. Louis Tobin, patriarch of the famously wealthy Tobin family, has just confessed to orchestrating the largest Ponzi scheme in Wall Street history; the U.S. Government has assigned Patty Hewes and Tom Shayes to find the Tobins' hidden money, and uncover any evidence that other Tobin family members (namely Louis' eldest child Joe and long-time attorney Leonard Winstone) had prior knowledge of the fraud. Ellen Parsons has taken a job at the District Attorney's office but, as the story unfolds, she finds herself being pulled further and further back into Patty's orbit. Tom, meanwhile, learns that he unwittingly invested with Louis Tobin and has lost 70% of his net worth and both his parents' and in-laws' savings. He struggles to keep his personal issues from interfering with the case and with keeping this secret from Patty.

Though the season earned mostly positive reviews from television critics, it continued to struggle in the ratings; soon after the season finale, FX announced it had canceled Damages due to low ratings. However, the series was eventually picked up by DirecTV for two additional seasons, which began airing the fourth season on July 13, 2011.

Cast and characters

Main cast 
 Glenn Close as Patty Hewes (13 episodes)
 Rose Byrne as Ellen Parsons (13 episodes)
 Tate Donovan as Thomas Shayes (13 episodes)
 Campbell Scott as Joe Tobin (12 episodes)
 Martin Short as Leonard Winstone (13 episodes)
 Ted Danson as Arthur Frobisher (4 episodes)

Recurring cast

Episodes

Production 
After Damages had finished airing its first season in October 2007, FX renewed the series for two additional 13-episode seasons. Production on both seasons was delayed due to the Writer's Guild Strike, which delayed the season two premiere until the beginning of 2009, and season three was consequently delayed until January 2010.

As with the previous two seasons, season three of Damages was executive produced by series creators Todd A. Kessler, Glenn Kessler, and Daniel Zelman. Mark A. Baker and Aaron Zelman served as co-executive producers with Mark Fish serving as co-producer. Aaron Zelman and Mark Fish each wrote one episode and co-wrote the sixth episode. Jeremy Doner and Adam Stein also wrote one episode each. The season's main directors were Matthew Penn (three episodes), Todd A. Kessler (two episodes), and Timothy Busfield (two episodes). Co-creators Daniel Zelman and Glenn Kessler each made his directorial debut with episode five and episode seven, respectively, as did series director of photography David Tuttman with episode ten. The remaining three episodes were directed by Tony Goldwyn, Chris Terrio, and series star Tate Donovan.

Reception

Awards and nominations
The third season received five nominations for the 62nd Primetime Emmy Awards:  Glenn Close for Outstanding Lead Actress in a Drama Series, Rose Byrne for Outstanding Supporting Actress in a Drama Series, Martin Short for Outstanding Supporting Actor in a Drama Series, Ted Danson for Outstanding Guest Actor in a Drama Series, and Lily Tomlin for Outstanding Guest Actress in a Drama Series.

Critical reviews 
The third season of Damages was met with mostly high praise, and it earned 81 out of 100 based on 16 reviews on the aggregate review website Metacritic. This qualifies as "universal acclaim".  Rotten Tomatoes gave the third season a 100% rating based on 18 critic reviews, with an average rating of 8.2 out of 10. Rotten Tomatoes' critical consensus reads: "This season of Damages grows even more masterful with dazzling performances all around, first-rate writing and savory storylines."

Ratings 
Despite positive critical reviews, Damages continued to struggle in the ratings. The premiere episode garnered 1.43 million viewers and a 0.3 ratings share with adults 18–49. This is down from the 1.72 million households that viewed the second-season premiere. Season three reached a ratings low point upon airing its tenth episode, "Tell Me I'm Not Racist," which attracted only 650,000 viewers and a 0.2 ratings share with adults 18–49. Though the ratings went into a slight incline for the remainder of the season, the finale was watched by only 910,000 households compared to the 1.05 million viewers who tuned in for the second-season finale.

References

External links 
 

2010 American television seasons
season 3